Attention Seeker is the second extended play record by American punk rock band The Regrettes. It was released on 12 January 2018 through Warner Bros. The EP was produced by Mike Elizondo.

Track listing

Personnel

The Regrettes
Lydia Night - lead vocals, rhythm guitar, composition
Genessa Gariano - lead guitar, backing vocals, composition, artwork
Sage Chavis - bass, backing vocals, composition
Maxx Morando - drums, composition

Additional personnel
Mike Elizondo - production, composition
Brent Arrowood - engineering
Adam Hawkins - engineering, mixing
Alonzo Lazaro - assistant production
Bob Ludwig - mastering
Marlhy Murphy - composition
Doc Pomus - composition
Mort Shuman - composition

References

2018 debut EPs
The Regrettes albums
Warner Records EPs
Albums produced by Mike Elizondo